Juan Pablo Nieto Salazar (born 25 February 1993) is a Colombian professional footballer who plays as midfielder for Deportes Tolima.

Honours

Club 
Alianza Petrolera
 Categoría Primera B (1): 2012

Atlético Nacional
 Superliga Colombiana (1): 2016

References

External links 
 

1993 births
Living people
Colombian footballers
Colombia under-20 international footballers
Categoría Primera A players
Categoría Primera B players
Atlético Nacional footballers
Alianza Petrolera players
Once Caldas footballers
Deportes Tolima footballers
Association football midfielders
People from Pereira, Colombia